Sabak  (Malay: Sabak) is a coastal town in Sabak Bernam District, Selangor, Malaysia. It is situated on the northwestern corner of Selangor, just south of the Bernam River, Selangor's natural border with Perak.

Major economic activities in the town are palm oil plantations ran by individuals as well as private organizations such as Sime Darby. This town is undergoing infrastructure development with added shops and drainage systems.

Sabak is the northernmost and westernmost town in Selangor, and is the furthest constituency from both Shah Alam and Kuala Lumpur. It is a 2-hour drive on Highway 5 from downtown Kuala Lumpur.

Politics and government
Sabak is represented in the Selangor State Legislative Assembly by PAS's Sallehen Mukhyi.

On the national level, Sabak town is within the Sabak Bernam electoral district, represented by Dato' Haji Mohd Fasiah bin Mohd Fakeh, from UMNO.

Sabak town, along with the entire Sabak Bernam constituency, forms the municipal area of the Sabak Bernam District Council (Majlis Daerah Sabak Bernam).

Public transportation
Sabak Bernam is inaccessible from any railway/metro service, though there is a daily bus service, known as the Sabak Bernam-Kuala Lumpur Ekspres, running seven trips a day from Pudu Sentral ( LRT Plaza Rakyat/ MRT Merdeka) to Sabak Bernam, Sekinchan, Sungai Besar and as far as Teluk Intan.

Notable Attractions
 Sabak Bernam Waterfront
 Sabak Bernam Museum
 Bernam River boat ports

Places of Worship
 Masjid Jamek Sultan Hishamuddin
 Sabak Bernam Thien Hock Kong Temple (沙白安南河边街天福宫), founded in 1890
 Sabak Bernam Guan Di Temple (沙白安南河畔关帝庙)
 Sabak Bernam Theam Hock Keong (沙白安南天福宫)
 Sabak Bernam Tian Fa Gong (沙白安南六条沟天法宫)
 Sabak Bernam Xian Fa Shi Gong Temple (沙白安南仙法师公古庙)
 Sabak Bernam Pek Lian Si (沙白安南白莲寺)
 Lord Murugan Temple
 Maahad Sultan Salahuddin Abd Aziz Shah

Facilities
 Tengku Ampuan Jemaah Hospital
 Maybank Branch Sabak Bernam 
 Public Bank Branch Sabak Bernam 
 Bank Simpanan Nasional Branch Sabak Bernam 
 Oil Stations - 5Petrol, Shell, Petronas, BP, Caltex
 Police Station Sabak Bernam
 Road Transport Department Sabak Bernam (JPJ)
 Restaurants - Restoran Haziq, Restoran Al-Iman(RSK), Restoran Toman, KFC 
 MDSB Food Corners - Ali Mamak Corner(No.32)
 Good Stores - 7-Eleven, 99 Speedmart, Ten Ten Hypermarket, Billion Hypermarket
 4 Digit Number Betting Stores - Magnum Corporation, Damacai, Sports Toto

Educations
 SJK (T) Ladang Torkington - (Primary School)
 SJK (C) Lum Hua - (Primary School)
 SK Khir Johari - (Primary School)
 Sekolah Kebangsaan Dr. Abdul Latiff - (Primary School)
 Kolej Tingkatan Enam Tunku Abdul Rahman Putra [collage]
 Sekolah Menengah Ungku Aziz - (Secondary School)
 Sekolah Agama Menengah Muhammadiah Pekan Sabak 
 Ministry of Higher Education (Malaysia) 's Polytechnic of Sultan Idris Shah (PSIS), Sg Lang
 Institut Perakaunan Negara (IPN), Sg Lang
 Institut Latihan Dan Dakwah Selangor (ILDAS), Sg Lang
 Ministry of Higher Education (Malaysia) 's Community College of Sabak Bernam

Other Uses
Sabak is also name of a Hindi movie starring Shatrughan Sinha, released in 1973.

References

Sabak Bernam District
Towns in Selangor